Kajino (written 梶野) is a Japanese surname. Notable people with the surname include:

, Japanese footballer
, Japanese footballer

See also
Studio Kajino, a Studio Ghibli subsidiary

Japanese-language surnames